Dutton Children's Books is a US publisher of children's books and a division of the Penguin Group. It is associated with the Dutton adult division. It was previously an imprint of E.P. Dutton, prior to 1986. They have been publishing books since 1852.

Dutton has published the Winnie-the-Pooh books by A.A. Milne in the USA since the 1920s and in Canada since the 2000s.

Award-winning titles

Caldecott Medal
 1973: The Funny Little Woman retold by Arlene Mosel, illustrated by Blair Lent
 1998: Rapunzel, retold and illustrated by Paul O. Zelinsky

Caldecott Honor Books
 1946: Sing Mother Goose by Opal Wheeler, illustrated by Marjorie Torrey
 1947: Sing in Praise: A Collection of the Best Loved Hymns by Opal Wheeler, illustrated by Marjorie Torrey
 1983: When I was Young in the Mountains by Cynthia Rylant, illustrated by Diane Goode* 1984: Hansel and Gretel retold by Rika Lesser, illustrated by Paul O. Zelinsky
 1987: Rumpelstiltskin by Paul O. Zelinsky
 1995: Swamp Angel by Paul O. Zelinsky

Golden Kite Award
 2003: Leonardo, Beautiful Dreamer by Robert Byrd

Newbery Medal
 1926: Shen of the Sea by Arthur Bowie Chrisman
 1951: Amos Fortune, Free Man by Elizabeth Yates
 1979: The Westing Game by Ellen Raskin

Newbery Honor
 1927: Gayneck, The Story of a Pigeon by Dhan Gopal Mukerji
 1929: The Boy Who Was by Grace Hallok
 1930: Vaino by Julia Davis Adams
 1931: Mountains are Free by Julia Davis Adams
 1960: My Side of the Mountain by Jean Craighead George
 1964: Rascal by Sterling North
 1975: Figgs & Phantoms by Ellen Raskin

Michael L. Printz Award
 2003: Postcards from No Man's Land by Aidan Chambers
 2006: Looking for Alaska by John Green

New York Times Best Illustrated Books
 1981: The Maid and The Mouse and The Odd-Shaped House: A Story in Rhyme by Paul O. Zelinsky
 1992: The Fortune-Tellers by Lloyd Alexander, illustrated by Trina Schart Hyman
 1994: Swamp Angel by Anne Isaacs, illustrated by Paul O. Zelinsky
 2001: Sun Bread by Elisa Kleven

References

External links

 

Children's book publishers
Book publishing company imprints
Penguin Books
Children's Books